The Atlas Building is a heritage-listed building in Perth, Western Australia. It is located in the Perth central business district at 8–10 The Esplanade, and sits along the south-western side of Sherwood Court.

The construction of the building in the 1930s was well documented.

The building was constructed for the Atlas Assurance Company, in an Inter-War Free Classical style, with an art-deco entrance and elevator. It has historical significance both architecturally and as one of few commercial developments in Perth constructed during the depression years.
In addition to Atlas, occupants of the building have included:
 A. B. Webb School of Art – run by Archibald Bertram Webb
 Commonwealth Crown Solicitor's Office
 Conigrave & Co estate agents
 Hill, Mclean Pty Ltd – Western Australian wool buying firm
 Commonwealth Government's Legal Service Bureau
 Perth Road Board
 Women's Australian National Service

The Museum of Perth is located within the Atlas Building.

References

Further reading

External links

List: History of the Atlas Building - Perth at Trove

The Esplanade (Perth)
State Register of Heritage Places in the City of Perth